The Cannery Ballroom is a music venue in Nashville, Tennessee. It lives in Nashville's Historic Cannery building, it is located between the thriving The Gulch neighborhood and the downtown. The building also houses two other music venues, the Mercy Lounge and The High Watt.

Built in 1883, the Cannery was originally a flour mill and later a place to grind coffee. The building earned its name when the Dale Food company bought it in 1957 and began processing food such as jams, jellies, mustard, mayonnaise, and peanut butter. eventually opening a restaurant called "The Cannery" in the early 1970s. The building housed a country music theatre in the late 1970s and evolved into one of Nashville's primary music venues in the 1980s and early 1990s. Rival Sons, Jane's Addiction, Iggy Pop, Lenny Kravitz, Biffy Clyro, Gregg Allman, Arkells, Robin Trower among other touring acts of the time played the Cannery. The Mercy Lounge is on the 2nd level of the structure with a standing room capacity of 500, a back bar featuring pool tables and classic pinball machines. The Mercy Lounge also features a luxury hospitality suite much like a Chicago or New York City warehouse district loft complete with kitchen and bathrooms.

References

External links
Official Site

Nightclubs in the United States
Music venues in Tennessee
Buildings and structures in Nashville, Tennessee
Tourist attractions in Nashville, Tennessee